The Three Stelae of Kōzuke (上野三碑) are three ancient stelae (graven stone monuments) in the former Kōzuke Province of Japan, located in what is now the city of Takasaki, Gunma Prefecture, in the Kantō region. Together, they were inscribed in the UNESCO Memory of the World Register as "Three Cherished Stelae of Ancient Kozuke" in 2017.

These are the oldest of the 18 known extant Japanese stelae. The Yamanoue Stele is from 681 AD (Asuka period), the Tago Stele from 711 AD (Nara period), and the Kanaizawa Stele from 726 AD (Nara period). The Yamanoue Stele is the oldest surviving example of Chinese characters using Japanese grammar.

References

Takasaki, Gunma
History of Gunma Prefecture
Kōzuke Province
Special Historic Sites
Steles in Japan
Asuka period
Nara period
Memory of the World Register